A list of episodes for the anime series Best Student Council.

References 

Best Student Council